Crassispira perrugata is an extinct species of sea snail, a marine gastropod mollusk in the family Pseudomelatomidae, the turrids and allies.

Description
The length of the shell attains 29.5 mm, its diameter 9.5 mm.

Distribution
Fossils have been found in  Quaternary strata in Florida and North Carolina, USA; age range: 2.588 to 0.781 Ma

References

 W.H. Dall (1890), Wagner Free Inst. Sci. Trans. vol. 3 pt 1, p. 31
 J. A. Gardner. 1948. Mollusca from the Miocene and Lower Pliocene of Virginia and North Carolina: Part 2. Scaphopoda and Gastropoda. United States Geological Survey Professional Paper 199(B):179-310

External links
 Fossilshells.nl: Crassispira perrugata

perrugata
Gastropods described in 1890